Sirma Voyvoda (1776–1864), was a Bulgarian rebel soldier. Disguised as a man, she participated in the guerilla movement in Ottoman Vardar Macedonia between 1791 and 1813. In 1856/1857, as an 80-year-old woman, the Bulgarian educator Dimitar Miladinov met her. In their collection "Bulgarian Folk Songs" the Miladinov brothers recorded a song about Sirma Voyvoda. Per the note that Dimitar Miladinov left under this song № 212, which refers to Sirma Vojvoda, she married a Bulgarian Mijak from Krushevo. She was killed by Turks in 1864. Sirma Voyvoda is recognized as a patriotic heroine also in what is today North Macedonia.

References

18th-century Bulgarian women
19th-century Bulgarian women
18th-century Bulgarian people
19th-century Bulgarian people
Bulgarian rebels
Female wartime cross-dressers
Women in 18th-century warfare
Women in 19th-century warfare
1776 births
1864 deaths
Women in European warfare